Asa Eldridge (1809–1856) was a sea captain from Yarmouth, Massachusetts. In 1854, Captain Eldridge guided the clipper ship Red Jacket from New York and to Liverpool in only in 13 days, 1 hour, and 25 minutes, dock to dock, setting a speed record for the fastest trans-Atlantic crossing by a commercial sailing vessel that has remained unbroken ever since. In 1856, Captain Eldridge skippered the ill-fated steamship SS Pacific, which disappeared at sea on a voyage from Liverpool to New York.

Eldridge is also known for having captained Cornelius Vanderbilt's private steam-powered yacht, the North Star, when the tycoon took a small group of family and friends on a summer-long cruise around Europe in 1853, and for his prior command of the packet ship Roscius in E.K. Collins' Dramatic Line.

Contemporary Account 
Charles Francis Swift says of Eldridge:

More Recent and Extensive Account 

Recent research has revealed many additional details about Asa Eldridge's career, including an earlier record-setting voyage two decades before his more famous feat on the Red Jacket. That earlier record came in 1833 on the ship America, which Eldridge took from Boston to Calcutta in 89 days – a time that remained unbeaten for the next two decades, and was then only bettered by one of the new generation of clipper ships. The new research also identified a number of other vessels that Eldridge commanded during his career that had not previously been linked with him. These include three sailing ships that he took to the Far East in the 1830s; another that he sailed around the "cotton triangle" in the early 1840s; a second Dramatic Liner, in addition to the Roscius long associated with him; and two early transatlantic steamships. Eldridge's close connection to the first of those steamships appears to have been the circumstance that introduced him to Cornelius Vanderbilt, and in turn to his appointment as commander of the North Star.

References 

1809 births
1850s missing person cases
1856 deaths
American sailors
People from Yarmouth, Massachusetts
People who died at sea
Sea captains